Disclosure is a 1994 American thriller film directed by Barry Levinson, starring Michael Douglas and Demi Moore. It is based on Michael Crichton's novel of the same name. The cast also includes Donald Sutherland, Caroline Goodall and Dennis Miller. The film is a combination thriller and slight mystery in an office setting within the computer industry in the mid-1990s. The main focus of the story, from which the film and book take their titles, is the issue of sexual harassment and its power structure. The film received mixed reviews from critics but was a box office success grossing $214 million against its $50 million budget.

Plot
Bob Garvin, founder and CEO of DigiCom, a computer technology company, plans to retire when his company merges with a larger company. Production line manager Tom Sanders expects to be promoted to run the CD-ROM division. Instead, Meredith Johnson, a former girlfriend of Tom's who is responsible for the merger, is promoted to the post, as Garvin wanted to "break the glass ceiling" and promote a woman in honor of his late daughter.

Meredith calls Tom into her office to discuss some operations regarding problems with the CD-ROM production line in Malaysia, but instead sexually forces herself onto him. He initially reciprocates her desire to engage him in oral sex but rebuffs her attempts to have full sexual intercourse. Meredith angrily screams a threat towards Tom for spurning her as he leaves. Later that night, Meredith calls Tom's home and tells his wife tomorrow's meeting starts an hour later than it does, tricking Tom into arriving late, allowing her to take his place in a meeting with the merger partners to discuss the problems with the CD-ROM drives, where Meredith pressured Tom into admitting that he is unaware of the cause of the problems.

Tom then discovers that Meredith has filed a sexual harassment complaint against him with legal counsel Philip Blackburn. To save the merger from a scandal, which will cause Garvin to lose $100 million if the deal is off, DigiCom officials demand that Tom accept reassignment to another location. He will lose his stock options in the new company, his career will be ruined, and he will be jobless if he takes the outplacement, as the other location is scheduled for sale after the merger. Tom receives an anonymous e-mail from "A Friend" that directs him to Seattle attorney Catherine Alvarez, who specializes in sexual harassment cases. Tom decides to sue DigiCom, alleging that it was Meredith who harassed him, at the expense of causing animosity with his wife and colleagues. The initial mediation goes badly for Tom as a tearful Meredith repeatedly lies and blames him.

After discovering a recording from Tom's phone records of the encounter proving that Meredith's accusation is false, Garvin, who believes the merger will be unsuccessful without Meredith, proposes that if Tom drops the lawsuit, he will not have to transfer, causing Tom to suspect that Meredith's accusations are vulnerable. Tom remembers mis-dialing a number on his cell phone during the encounter with Meredith but not hanging up. This inadvertently left the recording of the incident on a colleague's voicemail. Tom plays the recording at the next meeting and discredits Meredith. DigiCom agrees to a settlement calling for Meredith to be quietly eased out following the merger.

As Tom celebrates his apparent victory, he receives another e-mail from "A Friend" warning that all is not what it seems. Tom overhears Phillip telling Meredith that even though Tom won the sexual harassment suit, they will make Tom look incompetent at the next morning's merger conference, with Garvin's support. Since the problems with the CD-ROMs are shown as coming from the Malaysian production line, which is under Tom's responsibility, he can be fired as the cause of these problems. Tom attempts to look for clues in the company database, but his access privileges have been revoked. He remembers that the merging company's executives have a virtual reality demonstration machine in a nearby hotel that has access to the company database.

As he gets into DigiCom's files, he sees that Meredith is deleting them. Tom receives a call from a Malaysian colleague who is able to fax Tom copies of incriminating memos and videos. They show that Meredith and one of the head of operations in Malaysia agreed to change the production specifications that Tom had laid down, without his knowledge, to gain favor with the Malaysian government and to cut costs for the upcoming merger. Because of Meredith's complete lack of technical expertise and knowledge, the production changes ordered by her resulted in the problems afflicting the CD-ROMs that Tom is responsible for. In an attempt to save the merger that she had created and unwilling to take any responsibility, Meredith had set up the sexual encounter between her and Tom to falsely accuse him of sexual harassment to force him out of DigiCom so she could blame him for the changes, with Blackburn's support, while covering up and blaming the CD-ROM problems on him.

When Tom makes his presentation at the conference, Meredith brings up the production problems, but he is now able to publicly show the evidence exposing her direct involvement in causing defects with the hardware. After Meredith angrily accuses Tom of mounting a last-ditch effort of revenge while trying to justify her decisions involving the changes and continuing to blame him for poor decisions, Garvin realizes the full extent of her incompetence and has no other option but to fire her. Garvin subsequently announces that the merger has been completed and then names Stephanie Kaplan to head up the Seattle operation, a decision that Tom is pleased with, especially when she publicly highlights his contributions and says that she is relying on him to be her right-hand man going forward.  Meredith waits for Tom in the office, telling him that she's been offers several jobs as a headhunter and she 'may be back in 10 years to buy the company out.' Tom asks her if she's considered that maybe he set HER up, before leaving with a smile.

Tom subsequently asks Stephanie's son, Spencer, if he knows "A Friend". Spencer says he is the research assistant of Professor Arthur Friend at the University of Washington. Tom realizes that Spencer had access to Friend's office computer, enabling Stephanie (via her son) to have previously warned him as "A Friend" when he was in trouble, and that she knew exactly everything that was going on involving the CD-ROM Drives and Meredith. A gratified Tom is happy to resume his position as the Head of Manufacturing.

Cast

 Michael Douglas as Tom Sanders
 Demi Moore as Meredith Johnson
 Donald Sutherland as Bob Garvin
 Caroline Goodall as Susan Sanders
 Dennis Miller as Mark Lewyn
 Roma Maffia as Catherine Alvarez
 Dylan Baker as Philip Blackburn
 Rosemary Forsyth as Stephanie Kaplan
 Suzie Plakson as Mary Anne Hunter
 Nicholas Sadler as Don Cherry
 Jacqueline Kim as Cindy Chang
 Kate Williamson as Judge Barbara Murphy
 Donal Logue as Chance Geer
 Farrah Forke as Adele Lewyn
 Allan Rich as Ben Heller
 David Drew Gallagher as Spencer Kaplan

Production
Michael Crichton sold the movie rights for $1 million before the novel was published. Miloš Forman was originally attached to direct but left due to creative differences with Crichton. Barry Levinson and Alan J. Pakula were in contention to take the helm and Levinson was hired.

Annette Bening was originally set to play Meredith until she became pregnant and soon dropped out. Geena Davis and Michelle Pfeiffer were then considered before Levinson decided to cast Demi Moore. Crichton wrote the character Mark Lewyn for the film specifically with Dennis Miller in mind. The character from the book was somewhat modified for the screenplay to fit Miller's personality.

The visual effects and animation for the film, including in particular the virtual reality corridor sequence were all created and designed by the visual effects technicians at Industrial Light & Magic.

Filming locations
The movie was filmed in and around Seattle, Washington. The fictional corporation DigiCom is located in Pioneer Square, on a set which was constructed for the film. Production designer Neil Spisak said, "DigiCom needed to have a hard edge to it, with lots of glass and a modern look juxtaposed against the old red brick which is indigenous to the Pioneer Square area of Seattle. Barry liked the idea of using glass so that wherever you looked you'd see workers in their offices or stopping to chat. This seemed to fit the ominous sense that Barry was looking for, a sort of Rear Window effect, where you're looking across at people in their private spaces."

Also shown are the Washington State Ferries and Capt. Johnston Blakely Elementary School on Bainbridge Island, where Douglas's character's family lives. Other locations include Washington Park Arboretum, Volunteer Park, the Four Seasons Hotel on University St., Pike Place Market, and Smith Tower (Alvarez's law office). The director of photography was British cinematographer Tony Pierce-Roberts.

Marketing
The press kit for the film was the first multimedia press kit issued by Warner Bros. with them producing it on floppy disk.

Soundtrack
The score of Disclosure was composed, orchestrated and conducted by Ennio Morricone. Original Motion Picture Soundtrack from the Film Disclosure was released by Virgin Records on January 24, 1995.

Track listing
 "Serene Family" − 4:11
 "An Unusual Approach" − 7:07
 "With Energy and Decision" − 2:07
 "Virtual Reality" − 6:24
 "Preparation and Victory" − 4:04
 "Disclosure" − 0:49
 "Sad Family" − 1:29
 "Unemployed!" − 1:10
 "Sex and Computers" − 2:50
 "Computers and Work" − 2:00
 "Sex and Power" − 2:33
 "First Passacaglia" − 4:21
 "Second Passacaglia" − 1:41
 "Third Passacaglia" − 4:33
 "Sex, Power and Computers" − 4:23

Reception
Critic Roger Ebert called the film's theme "basically a launch pad for sex scenes" and further said "and yet the movie is so sleek, so glossy, so filled with Possessoporn (toys so expensive they're erotic), that you can enjoy it like a Sharper Image catalog that walks and talks." He gave it two stars out of a possible four. Ian Nathan of Empire magazine gave it four stars out of five and called it "genuinely gripping", further stating that "Demi Moore makes an awesome femme fatale." The film has an approval rating of 59% on Rotten Tomatoes based on 63 reviews.

Disclosure was a financial success, grossing $214 million worldwide ($83 million in U.S. and Canadian ticket sales and $131 million in other territories), against a budget of about $55 million. It became one of director Barry Levinson's most successful films after his initial successes with Good Morning, Vietnam and Rain Man.

Year-end lists
 Honorable mention – Jeff Simon, The Buffalo News
 Dishonorable mention – Dan Craft, The Pantagraph

In popular culture
The adult animated sitcom Big Mouth parodied the film in "Disclosure the Movie: The Musical" (season 3 episode 10), featuring a  raunchy stage musical adaptation starring pre-teen students.

See also
 Aitraaz, Bollywood remake of Disclosure
 Inkaar (2013 film), a Hindi film with a similar plot
 Indira Vizha, a Tamil film adaptation

References

External links

 
 
 
 
 Movie stills

1994 films
1994 drama films
1994 thriller films
1990s erotic drama films
1990s erotic thriller films
1990s legal films
1990s thriller drama films
American business films
American courtroom films
American erotic drama films
American erotic thriller films
American legal drama films
American thriller drama films
Films about businesspeople
Films about computing
Films about sexual harassment
Films about technological impact
Films based on works by Michael Crichton
Films directed by Barry Levinson
Films scored by Ennio Morricone
Films set in Seattle
Films set in Washington (state)
Films shot in Washington (state)
Films shot in Seattle
Films with screenplays by Paul Attanasio
Legal thriller films
Techno-thriller films
Warner Bros. films
1990s English-language films
1990s American films